I'll Show You or I Will Show You may refer to:

 "I'll Show You" (Justin Bieber song), 2015
 "I'll Show You" (Alexander Rybak and Paula Seling song), 2012
 "I'll Show You", 1963 single by William Bell
 "I'll Show You", song on Dexys Midnight Runners album Too-Rye-Ay
 "I'll Show You", song on Boyz II Men album Full Circle written by James Moss
 "I Will Show You", song by Oasis from album The Early Years
 "Boyeojulge" (보여줄게 I Will Show You), a 2012 song by Ailee from album Invitation
"I'll Show You", 2020 song on K/DA's All Out (EP)